Jose Morales (30 October 1909 – 2 November 1944) was a Peruvian international football player. During his career, he participated with the Peru national football team in the 1936 Summer Olympics held in Berlin, Germany.

References

External links

1909 births
1944 deaths
Footballers at the 1936 Summer Olympics
Olympic footballers of Peru
Peruvian footballers
Club Alianza Lima footballers
Association football forwards